Peter Adolphus McIntyre (July 19, 1840 – July 16, 1910) was a Canadian politician, public servant, physician and coroner.

Born at Peterville in Kings County, Prince Edward Island, McIntyre's paternal grandfather came to Canada from Scotland around 1785 and settled at Cable Head, PEI. McIntyre's great-grandfather on his mother's side fought under General Wolfe at the Battle of the Plains of Abraham in 1759.

McIntyre was educated at the Quebec Seminary, Laval University and McGill University where he earned his medical degree in 1867. He returned to Prince Edward Island to begin his practice. He served as Kings County coroner for several years.

In 1872 he was appointed one of the commissioners overlooking the construction of the Prince Edward Island Railway and was railway commander.

Following Prince Edward Island's entry into Canadian confederation which occurred, in part, as a result of the debt incurred by the colony for the railway's construction, McIntyre was elected in the 1874 federal election to the House of Commons of Canada as a Liberal Member of Parliament for Kings County. He was defeated in the 1878 federal election but regained his seat in 1882 and was re-elected in 1887. After being defeated in the next two elections,  McIntyre was appointed the seventh Lieutenant Governor of Prince Edward Island by the Laurier government in 1899. He served in office until 1904 and died six years later in Souris, P.E.I.

References

1840 births
1910 deaths
People from Kings County, Prince Edward Island
Liberal Party of Canada MPs
Lieutenant Governors of Prince Edward Island
Members of the House of Commons of Canada from Prince Edward Island
McGill University Faculty of Medicine alumni
Canadian coroners